Tuek Thla may refer to several places in Cambodia:
 Tuek Thla, Banteay Meanchey
 Tuek Thla, Battambang
 Tuek Thla, Kampong Speu
 Tuek Thla, Phnom Penh
 Tuek Thla, Prey Veng
 Tuek Thla, Siem Reap
 Tuek Thla, Sihanouk
 Tuek Thla, Takeo